John Mitchell Taylor (23 May 1932 – 18 November 2021) was a Scottish bishop. He was the Bishop of Glasgow and Galloway in the Scottish Episcopal Church from 1991 to 1996.

Early life and education 
Taylor was born in Aberdeen. He was educated at Banff Academy, and then at the University of Aberdeen between 1951 and 1954, graduating with a Master of Arts in 1954. He then studied at the Edinburgh Theological College between 1954 and 1956.

Ordained ministry 
He was ordained deacon in 1956, and priest in 1957 by the Bishop of Aberdeen and Orkney. He was assistant curate at St Margaret's Church in Aberdeen (1956–1958) and then curate (1958–1959) and rector (1959–1964) of Holy Cross Church in Glasgow. He then served as rector of St Ninian's Church in Glasgow (1964–1973) and St John the Evangelist Church in Dumfries (1973–1991), his final appointment before his ordination to the episcopate. He also was a canon of St Mary's cathedral chapter between 1979 and 1991. Subsequently, whilst in Dumfries, he was chaplain at the Crichton Royal Hospital, the Dumfries and Galloway Royal Infirmary and HM Prison Dumfries.

Bishop
Taylor was elected Bishop of Glasgow and Galloway in March 1991 and was consecrated in May 1991. He retired in 1996 and became an honorary canon of St Mary's Cathedral in 1999.

References

1932 births
2021 deaths
Clergy from Aberdeen
Alumni of the University of Aberdeen
Alumni of Edinburgh Theological College
Bishops of Glasgow and Galloway
20th-century Scottish Episcopalian bishops
People educated at Banff Academy